The 2008 Stanley Cup playoffs of the National Hockey League (NHL) began on April 9, 2008, after the 2007–08 regular season. The 16 teams that qualified, eight from each conference, played best-of-seven series for conference quarterfinals, semifinals and championships, then the conference champions played a best-of-seven series for the Stanley Cup.

The Buffalo Sabres became the second team to miss the playoffs after winning the Presidents' Trophy in the prior season. This would not happen again until 2015.

The Finals ended on June 4, 2008, with the Detroit Red Wings defeating the Pittsburgh Penguins four games to two to win their eleventh championship and their fourth in eleven seasons. Red Wings winger Henrik Zetterberg was awarded the Conn Smythe Trophy as the playoffs' Most Valuable Player. Sidney Crosby and Zetterberg led the tournament with 27 points.

Highlights
The San Jose Sharks were the media's favorite to win the Cup going into the playoffs, having gone the entire month of March without a regulation loss and nearly finishing first overall during the regular season.

Milestones
In game one of the Western Conference Quarterfinals against the Minnesota Wild, captain Joe Sakic of the Colorado Avalanche extended his record for playoff overtime goals to eight, with a goal 11:11 into overtime. Chris Chelios appeared in his 248th career playoff game surpassing Patrick Roy for most career playoff games of all time.

In game one of the Western Conference Semifinals in San Jose, Dallas Stars center Brad Richards tied an NHL record for most points in one period of a playoff game, when he recorded one goal and three assists in the third period.

In the Western Conference Semifinals against the Avalanche, Johan Franzen became the first player to score multiple hat tricks in a series since Jari Kurri tallied three in 1985. In the process, he set an NHL record for most goals in a four-game sweep and the Red Wings' record for most goals in a playoff series with nine, beating the previous record of eight set by Gordie Howe in 1949. Franzen achieved this feat in only four games, moreover, while Howe achieved it in seven.

Game six of the Western Conference Semifinals between the Sharks and Stars was the eighth-longest game in the history of the NHL, lasting 129:03. Stars captain Brenden Morrow ended the game at 9:03 of the fourth overtime, tapping in a power-play goal. Goaltenders Marty Turco and Evgeni Nabokov set team records for saves in a game with 61 and 53, respectively. The final score was 2–1.

Detroit captain Nicklas Lidstrom became the first European (and Swedish) born and trained player to lead an NHL team to the Stanley Cup.

New interpretation of NHL rule
In game three of their Eastern Conference Quarterfinal series, while on a five-on-three power play, the New York Rangers' Sean Avery tried to screen the New Jersey Devils' goaltender Martin Brodeur by waving his hands and stick while facing Brodeur. This prompted the NHL to issue an interpretation of the league's rules, stating that an unsportsmanlike conduct minor penalty will be called on actions such as the one used by Avery.

Playoff seeds

Eastern Conference
Montreal Canadiens, Northeast Division champions, Eastern Conference regular season champions – 104 points
Pittsburgh Penguins, Atlantic Division champions – 102 points
Washington Capitals, Southeast Division champions – 94 points
New Jersey Devils – 99 points
New York Rangers – 97 points
Philadelphia Flyers – 95 points
Ottawa Senators – 94 points  (43 wins)
Boston Bruins – 94 points (41 wins)

Western Conference
Detroit Red Wings, Central Division champions, Western Conference regular season champions, President's Trophy winners – 115 points
San Jose Sharks, Pacific Division champions – 108 points
Minnesota Wild, Northwest Division champions – 98 points
Anaheim Ducks – 102 points
Dallas Stars – 97 points
Colorado Avalanche – 95 points
Calgary Flames – 94 points
Nashville Predators – 91 points

Playoff bracket
In each round, the highest remaining seed in each conference was matched against the lowest remaining seed. The higher-seeded team is awarded home ice advantage, which gave them a possible maximum of four games on their home ice, with the lower-seeded team getting a possible maximum of three. In the Stanley Cup Finals, home ice is determined based on regular season points. Each best-of-seven series followed a 2–2–1–1–1 format. This meant that the higher-seeded team had home ice for games one and two, and if necessary, five and seven, while the lower-seeded team had home ice for games three, four and, if necessary, six.

Conference Quarterfinals

Eastern Conference Quarterfinals

(1) Montreal Canadiens vs. (8) Boston Bruins

The Montreal Canadiens entered the playoffs as the Eastern Conference regular season and Northeast Division champions with 104 points. Boston qualified as the eighth seed earning 94 points (losing the tie-breaker in total wins with Ottawa) during the regular season. This was the 31st playoff meeting between these two Original Six rivals, with Montreal winning twenty-three of the thirty previous series. They last met in the 2004 Eastern Conference Quarterfinals where Montreal won in seven games. Montreal won all eight games during this year's regular season series.

The Canadiens held off Boston winning the series in seven games. Montreal took the lead early in game one and never looked back in a 4–1 victory. The Bruins forced overtime in game two by scoring two third period goals before coming up short in the first overtime as Alexei Kovalev ended the game with a power-play goal at 2:30 for Montreal. Boston forward Marc Savard scored the overtime winner in a 2–1 game three victory; the win ended a 13-game losing streak against Montreal by the Bruins. Patrice Brisebois scored the only goal of game four for the Canadiens and Carey Price made 27 saves for his first career playoff shutout in a 1–0 win. Boston scored five unanswered goals in game five, including four goals in the third period as they extended the series with a 5–1 win. For the second game in a row the Bruins scored four times in the third period as they tied the series with a 5–4 victory. In game seven Montreal rebounded from the lackluster performances of their previous two games and eliminated Boston with a 5–0 win.

(2) Pittsburgh Penguins vs. (7) Ottawa Senators

The Pittsburgh Penguins entered the playoffs as the Atlantic Division champions, earning the second seed in the Eastern Conference with 102 points. Ottawa qualified as the seventh seed earning 94 points (winning the tie-breaker in total wins with Boston) during the regular season. This was the second playoff meeting between these two teams, with Ottawa winning the only previous series. They last met in the previous year's Eastern Conference Quarterfinals where Ottawa won in five games. Ottawa won three of the four games during this year's regular season series.

The Penguins swept the Senators in four games. Marc-Andre Fleury made 26 saves and Gary Roberts scored twice as the Penguins won game one by a score of 4–0. Penguins forward Ryan Malone put Pittsburgh ahead again in game two after they blew a three-goal lead earlier in the game with a power-play goal at 18:58 of the third period; the Penguins held on for a 5–3 victory. Sidney Crosby's goal in the opening seconds of the third period of game three broke a 1–1 tie as Pittsburgh eventually won 4–1. Pittsburgh completed the series sweep in game four with a 3–1 win.

(3) Washington Capitals vs. (6) Philadelphia Flyers

The Washington Capitals entered the playoffs as the Southeast Division champions, earning the third seed in the Eastern Conference with 94 points. Philadelphia qualified as the sixth seed earning 95 points during the regular season. This was the fourth playoff meeting between these two teams, with Washington winning the two of the three previous series. They last met in the 1989 Patrick Division Semifinals where Philadelphia won in six games. Philadelphia won this year's four-game regular season series earning five of eight points.

The Flyers held off the Capitals in a seven-game series. Washington scored three times in the third period of game one as they overcame a two-goal deficit before Alexander Ovechkin scored the game-winner for the Capitals with just over four and a half minutes remaining in regulation time. Martin Biron made 24 saves as the Flyers won game two 2–0. The Flyers broke game three open with two goals just 17 seconds apart in the first period as they went on to win by a final score of 6–3. Philadelphia forward Mike Knuble ended game four at 6:40 of the second overtime period as the Flyers took a 3–1 series lead. Sergei Fedorov and Mike Green each recorded two points for Washington as they extended the series with a 3–2 victory. The Flyers took a two-goal lead early in the second period of game six before the Capitals responded with four unanswered goals to force a seventh and deciding game. Flyers goaltender Martin Biron made 39 saves in game seven and Joffrey Lupul scored a power-play goal in the first overtime as the Flyers advanced to the Conference Semifinals.

(4) New Jersey Devils vs. (5) New York Rangers

The New Jersey Devils entered the playoffs as the fourth seed in the Eastern Conference with 99 points. New York qualified as the fifth seed earning 97 points during the regular season. This was the fifth playoff meeting between these two teams, with the Rangers winning three of the four previous series. They last met in the 2006 Eastern Conference Quarterfinals where New Jersey won in four games. New York won seven of the eight games during this year's regular season series.

The Rangers defeated the Devils in five games. Scott Gomez had three assists in game one as the Rangers won 4–1. New York scored twice in 23 seconds to break a scoreless tie in the third period of game two and Henrik Lundqvist allowed one goal against for the second consecutive game as the Rangers took a 2–0 series lead. During the second period of game three while on a two-man advantage, the Rangers' Sean Avery tried to screen New Jersey goaltender Martin Brodeur by waving his hands and stick while facing Brodeur. Devils forward John Madden ended the game at 6:01 of the first overtime in a 4–3 New Jersey victory. After the game the NHL issued an interpretation of the League's rules, stating that an unsportsmanlike conduct minor penalty would be called on actions such as the one used by Avery. Marc Staal broke a 3–3 tie for the Rangers late in third period of game four as New York took a 3–1 series lead. Rangers forward Jaromir Jagr had a goal and two assists as New York finished off the Devils in game five with a 5–3 win.

Western Conference Quarterfinals

(1) Detroit Red Wings vs. (8) Nashville Predators

The Detroit Red Wings entered the playoffs as the Presidents' Trophy winners, the Western Conference regular season and Central Division champions with 115 points. Nashville qualified as the eighth seed earning 91 points during the regular season. This was the second playoff meeting between these two teams, with Detroit winning the only previous series. They last met in the 2004 Western Conference Quarterfinals where Detroit won in six games. Detroit won five of the eight games during this year's regular season series.

The Red Wings defeated Nashville in six games. Nashville goaltender Dan Ellis made 37 saves in a losing effort and Henrik Zetterberg scored twice in the third period for the Red Wings as Detroit took game one by a final score of 3–1.  Detroit forward Kris Draper broke the tie early in the second period of game two as the Red Wings won 4–2. Nashville scored two goals just nine seconds apart late in game three as Jason Arnott scored the game-winning goal in a 5–3 Predators victory. Red Wings goaltender Dominik Hasek was pulled in the second period of game four after allowing three goals; he was replaced by Chris Osgood for the remainder of the series, the Predators evened the series with a 3–2 win. Johan Franzen ended game five 1:48 into the first overtime as the Red Wings took a 2–1 victory. Detroit eliminated the Predators with a 20 save shutout from Chris Osgood in a 3–0 win in game six.

(2) San Jose Sharks vs. (7) Calgary Flames

The San Jose Sharks entered the playoffs as the Pacific Division champions, earning the second seed in the Western Conference with 108 points. Calgary qualified as the seventh seed earning 94 points during the regular season. This was the third and most recent playoff meeting between these two teams, with the teams splitting the two previous series. They last met in the 2004 Western Conference Final where Calgary won in six games. Calgary won three of the four games during this year's regular season series.

San Jose eliminated the Flames in seven games. Stephane Yelle's second goal of the game was the game-winner as Calgary took the opening game of the series 3–2. San Jose goaltender Evgeni Nabokov recorded a shutout making 21 saves in game two to help the Sharks tie the series. The Flames rallied from a three-goal deficit to win game three 4–3 as backup goaltender Curtis Joseph relieved Miikka Kiprusoff after he was pulled just three and a half minutes into the game. San Jose scored two goals late in the third period of game four to win the game 3–2. San Jose had a three-goal lead in game five and held off a Calgary comeback in a 4–3 victory. Miikka Kiprusoff recorded a shutout in game six to force a deciding game seven as the Flames won 2–0. After being held pointless in the first six games of the series San Jose forward Jeremy Roenick scored two goals and two assists in game seven as the Sharks won 5–3.

(3) Minnesota Wild vs. (6) Colorado Avalanche

The Minnesota Wild entered the playoffs as the Northwest Division champions, earning the third seed in the Western Conference with 98 points. Colorado qualified as the sixth seed earning 95 points during the regular season. This was the second playoff meeting between these two teams, with Minnesota winning the only previous series. They last met in the 2003 Western Conference Quarterfinals where Minnesota won in seven games. Minnesota won five of the eight games during this year's regular season series.

The Avalanche eliminated the Wild in six games. Colorado captain Joe Sakic added to his own league record in game one as he scored his eighth and final career playoff overtime goal in a 3–2 victory. The teams traded goals in the final two minutes of regulation in game two before Keith Carney ended the game 1:14 into the first overtime period, as the Wild evened the series with a 3–2 win. Pierre-Marc Bouchard scored the overtime winner in game three for Minnesota at 11:58 in the third consecutive overtime game of this series. Five different Colorado players scored in game four as the Avalanche forced Wild goaltender Niklas Backstrom from the game, winning 5–1. Colorado goaltender Jose Theodore made 38 saves in a 3–2 game five win. Theodore continued his strong play in game six as he made 34 saves from 35 shots against as Colorado closed out the series with a 2–1 victory.

(4) Anaheim Ducks vs. (5) Dallas Stars

The Anaheim Ducks entered the playoffs as the fourth seed in the Western Conference with 102 points. Dallas qualified as the fifth seed earning 97 points during the regular season. This was the second playoff meeting between these two teams, with Anaheim winning the only previous series. They last met in the 2003 Western Conference Semifinals where Anaheim won in six games. Dallas won five of the eight games during this year's regular season series.

The Stars defeated the Ducks in six games. Dallas took advantage of the undisciplined play of the Ducks in game one as they scored four goals on the power-play and Marty Turco made 23 saves in a 4–0 victory. The Stars broke open game two by scoring three times in the third period as they won 5–2. In game three the Ducks jumped out to an early 4–0 lead, Anaheim held on to win the game 4–2. Stars goaltender Marty Turco came eight seconds short of posting a shutout in game four as he made 28 saves in a 3–1 Dallas victory. The Ducks avoided elimination in game five as their special teams contributed two power-play goals in a 5–2 win. Corey Perry gave Anaheim a one-goal lead after two periods of play in game six before the Stars scored four unanswered goals in the third period and ended the series with a 4–1 victory.

Conference Semifinals

Eastern Conference Semifinals

(1) Montreal Canadiens vs. (6) Philadelphia Flyers

This was the fifth playoff meeting between these two teams, with Montreal winning three of the four previous series. They last met in the 1989 Prince of Wales Conference Final where Montreal won in six games. Montreal swept this year's four game regular season series.

The Flyers eliminated the Canadiens in five games. Montreal fought back from a two-goal deficit early in game one as Alexei Kovalev forced overtime with his second goal of the game in the final minute of regulation time. In the first overtime period Canadiens forward Tom Kostopoulos scored the game-winner 48 seconds into the period, in a 4–3 Montreal victory. R. J. Umberger scored twice for the Flyers in game two as Philadelphia evened the series with a 4–2 win. Philadelphia scored three times in the second period of game three and hung on to win 3–2 despite allowing two power-play goals in the third period after Derian Hatcher was ejected from the game for boarding Francis Bouillon. Flyers goaltender Martin Biron made 36 saves as the Flyers won game four 4–2. Flyers forward Scottie Upshall broke the tie in game five as he scored the series-clinching goal with just over three minutes remaining in regulation time as Philadelphia earned a 6–4 victory.

(2) Pittsburgh Penguins vs. (5) New York Rangers

This was the fourth playoff meeting between these two teams, with Pittsburgh winning all three of the previous series. They last met in the 1996 Eastern Conference Semifinals where Pittsburgh won in five games. New York won five of the eight games during this year's regular season series.

The Penguins defeated the Rangers in five games. The Penguins scored two goals 14 and 20 seconds apart in both the second and third periods of game one as they overcame a 3–0 deficit early in the second period. Evgeni Malkin scored a late power-play goal for the Penguins as they held on to win the game 5–4. Pittsburgh goaltender Marc-Andre Fleury made 26 saves to earn his second shutout of the playoffs in game two as the Penguins won 2–0. Evgeni Malkin's second power-play goal of the game scored late in the second period of game three held up as the game-winning goal as the Penguins won 5–3. Henrik Lundqvist made 29 saves in a shutout performance as the Rangers avoided elimination with a 3–0 victory in game four. The Rangers battled back to tie the game early in the third period of game five, however they came up short in overtime as Pittsburgh's Marian Hossa scored the series-winner at 7:10 of the first overtime period to win the series for the Penguins.

Western Conference Semifinals

(1) Detroit Red Wings vs. (6) Colorado Avalanche

This was the sixth playoff meeting between these two teams, with Colorado winning three of the five previous series. They last met in the 2002 Western Conference Final where Detroit won in seven games. Detroit swept this year's four game regular season series.

The Red Wings swept the Avalanche in four games. Avalanche goaltender Jose Theodore was pulled early in the second period of game one after allowing four goals on 16 shots; the Red Wings held on to win 4–3. Detroit forward Johan Franzen's hat trick in game two helped the Red Wings to a 5–1 victory. Henrik Zetterberg's power-play goal just past the midway mark of the second period held up as the game-winner for Detroit in game three. After allowing the tying goal early in the first period of game four, the Red Wings scored the next seven goals and easily eliminated the Avalanche with an 8–2 win.

(2) San Jose Sharks vs. (5) Dallas Stars

This was the third playoff meeting between these two teams, with Dallas winning both of the previous series. They last met in the 2000 Western Conference Semifinals where Dallas won in five games. Dallas won this year's eight-game regular season series earning ten of sixteen points.

The Stars held on to defeat the Sharks in six games. Jonathan Cheechoo tied game one late in the third period for San Jose, but Dallas captain Brenden Morrow scored 4:39 into the first overtime to give Dallas a 3–2 victory. Dallas forward Brad Richards keyed a four-goal outburst in the third period of game two by scoring a goal and three assists to lead the Stars to a 5–2 win. In game three the Stars overcame a one-goal deficit in the third period as they won in the first overtime on a goal from defenceman Mattias Norstrom at 4:37. Milan Michalek broke the tie for San Jose in game four with his power-play goal at 3:26 of the third period as the Sharks avoided elimination with a 2–1 victory. Dallas took a two-goal lead into the third period of game five, however the Sharks tied the game with goals by Milan Michalek and Brian Campbell. Overtime was needed for the third time in five games and just 1:05 into the first overtime San Jose forward Joe Pavelski converted on a turnover to keep the Sharks alive with a 3–2 win. After trading goals in regulation time, game six became the eighth-longest game in NHL history as Brenden Morrow tipped home a pass on the power-play from defenceman Stephane Robidas to end the game 9:03 into the fourth overtime period and win the series for the Stars 4–2.

Conference Finals

Eastern Conference Final

(2) Pittsburgh Penguins vs. (6) Philadelphia Flyers

This was the fourth playoff meeting between these two teams, with Philadelphia winning all three of the previous series. They last met in the 2000 Eastern Conference Semifinals where Philadelphia won in six games. Pittsburgh most recently made it to the Conference Finals in 2001, when they lost to the New Jersey Devils in five games. Philadelphia last made the Conference Finals in 2004, where they lost in seven games to the Tampa Bay Lightning. Philadelphia won five of the eight games during this year's regular season series.

The Penguins eliminated their cross-state rivals the Flyers in five games. Evgeni Malkin's seventh goal of the playoffs held up as the game-winner for Pittsburgh in game one as the Penguins earned a 4–2 win. Pittsburgh forward Maxime Talbot broke the tie in game two just before the midway mark of the third period and Jordan Staal added an empty-net goal for the Penguins to give them their second consecutive 4–2 victory. Marian Hossa scored twice in game three for the Penguins as they won the game 4–1 to take a commanding 3–0 series lead. The Flyers jumped out to a 3–0 lead in the first period of game four and held on to win the game 4–2. Marian Hossa recorded four points for Pittsburgh in game five as the Penguins won their eighth consecutive home game to advance to the Stanley Cup Finals by a decisive final score of 6–0.

Western Conference Final

(1) Detroit Red Wings vs. (5) Dallas Stars

This was the fourth playoff meeting between these two teams, with Detroit winning all three of the previous series. They last met in the 1998 Western Conference Final where Detroit won in six games. This was Detroit's second consecutive Conference Finals appearance; they lost to the Anaheim Ducks in six games in the previous year. Dallas last made the Conference Finals in 2000, where they defeated the Colorado Avalanche in seven games. Detroit won three of the four games during this year's regular season series.

The Red Wings defeated the Stars in six games. Detroit scored three power-play goals as they took game one 4–1. Red Wings' goaltender Chris Osgood made 17 saves in game two to give Detroit a 2–1 win. Stars' forward Mike Ribeiro was assessed a match penalty at the end of game two for retaliating to an earlier stick infraction with a two-handed slash to Chris Osgood's chest; neither players were suspended. Detroit forward Pavel Datsyuk scored a hat-trick in game three for the Red Wings; while Osgood stopped 16 shots for the 5–2 win. Marty Turco made 33 saves as the Stars avoided elimination in game four winning 3–1. Turco continued his strong play for Dallas in game five as he stopped 38 shots in a 2–1 victory. The Red Wings used the strength of a three-goal first period in game six to eliminate the Stars and return to the Stanley Cup Finals for the first time since 2002.

Stanley Cup Finals

This was the first playoff meeting between these two teams. Both teams won their last appearance in the Finals; Detroit defeated Carolina in five games in 2002, while Pittsburgh swept Chicago in four games in 1992. The teams did not play each other during this year's regular season.

Player statistics

Skaters

These are the top ten skaters based on points. If the list exceeds ten skaters because of a tie in points, all of the tied skaters are shown.

GP = Games played; G = Goals; A = Assists; Pts = Points; +/– = Plus/minus; PIM = Penalty minutes

Goaltending

This is a combined table of the top five goaltenders based on goals against average and the top five goaltenders based on save percentage with at least 420 minutes played. The table is sorted by GAA, and the criteria for inclusion is bolded.

GP = Games played; W = Wins; L = Losses; SA = Shots against; GA = Goals against; GAA = Goals against average; Sv% = Save percentage; SO = Shutouts; TOI = Time On Ice (minutes:seconds)

Television

National Canadian English-language coverage of the playoffs were split between the CBC and TSN, with the CBC holding exclusive rights to the Stanley Cup Finals. French-language telecasts were broadcast on RDS and RDS2. This marked the last season that all playoff games involving Canadian teams had to air on the CBC instead of TSN, even if it mean they had to be broadcast regionally. Under new contracts that would take effect in 2009, the CBC and TSN would began to select the rights to individual series using a draft-like setup, regardless if they involved Canadian teams.

In the United States, coverage was split between NBC and Versus. During the first three rounds, NBC primarily televised weekend afternoon games and Versus aired evening games. During the first and second round, excluding games exclusively broadcast on NBC, the regional rights holders of each participating U.S. team produced local telecasts of their respective games. Not all first and second-round games were nationally televised, while the Conference Finals were exclusively broadcast on either NBC or Versus. Versus then aired games one and two of the Stanley Cup Finals while NBC televised the remainder of the series.

See also
2007–08 NHL season
List of NHL seasons

References

playoffs
Stanley Cup playoffs